Gunārs Cilinskis (23 May 1931, Riga  — 25 July 1992, Riga District) was a Latvian theater and film actor, film director and screenwriter. He was a People's Artist of the USSR (1979).

Family 

 Wife  — Velta Line (1923-2012), actress, People's Artist of the Soviet Union (1973)
 Son  — Aigars (1958-2007)

References

External links
 
 Riga Film Studio
 Sonate au-dessus d'un lac

1931 births
1992 deaths
Film people from Riga
Soviet male film actors
20th-century Latvian male actors
Soviet film directors
Latvian film directors
Soviet screenwriters
Latvian screenwriters
People's Artists of the USSR
Recipients of the Vasilyev Brothers State Prize of the RSFSR
Latvian Academy of Music alumni
Soviet male stage actors
Latvian male stage actors
20th-century screenwriters
Actors from Riga